Exo Laurentides provides local bus service for the southern portion of the Laurentides region of Quebec, Canada, mainly the suburban area on the northwest side of Montreal. The former services of CIT des Basses Laurentides, CIT de Deux-Montagnes, OMIT de St-Eustache and OMIT de St-Jérôme were amalgamated in 2004 to form the new Conseil Intermunicipal de Transport Laurentides with expanded service to some areas.

The communities served by the CITL are Blainville, Bois-des-Filion, Boisbriand, Deux-Montagnes, Lorraine, Mirabel, Oka, Pointe-Calumet, Rosemère, Sainte-Anne-des-Plaines, Saint-Eustache, Sainte-Marthe-sur-le-Lac, Sainte-Thérèse, Saint-Jérôme and Saint-Joseph-du-Lac.

Bus Terminals
 Saint-Jérôme station 
 Sainte-Thérèse station
 Terminus Saint-Eustache

Bus and taxi routes

See also 
 Exo (public transit) bus services

References

External links
 History of Montreal suburbs, Conseil Intermunicipal de Transport (CIT)

Sainte-Thérèse, Quebec
Transit agencies in Quebec
Transport in Laurentides